Callum Roberts (born 14 April 1997) is an English professional footballer who plays as a winger for Aberdeen.

Early career
Roberts joined Newcastle United at the age of eight and also played youth football for Whitley Bay Sproggs while attending Churchill Community College in Wallsend.

While still at school during the 2012–13 season, Roberts scored eight goals in nine league appearances for the Newcastle United Under-18s in the 2012–13 Professional U18 Development League.

He officially joined the Newcastle United Academy the following season and made 19 appearances for the Under-18s in the 2013–14 Professional U18 Development League, scoring four goals. He also made two appearances in the FA Youth Cup as Newcastle United reached the Quarter Finals of the competition. He also made the step up to Under-21 level, making ten appearances in the 2013–14 Professional U21 Development League and scoring his first goal at that level in their match against Liverpool at Anfield.

Club career

Newcastle United 

On 3 January 2015, Roberts made his senior debut, coming on as a second-half substitute in an FA Cup match against Leicester City, a match which Leicester City won 1–0. At the end of January 2015, he signed his first professional contract with Newcastle United, committing himself to his hometown club on a long-term deal.

On 15 January 2019, Roberts scored his first goal for Newcastle in a 4–2 FA Cup win against Blackburn Rovers.

He was released by Newcastle after the 2018–19 season.

Gateshead (loan) 
Shortly after making his Newcastle United debut, on 16 January 2015, it was announced that he joined Football Conference side and near-neighbours Gateshead on a month-long loan deal. This deal was later extended to a season-long deal, but he was recalled on 26 February to provide injury cover at Newcastle United, having made three appearances during his spell at Gateshead.

Kilmarnock (loan) 
On 9 January 2017, Roberts moved on loan to Scottish Premiership club Kilmarnock for the remainder of the season, along with Newcastle teammates Freddie Woodman and Sean Longstaff. He made his debut on 21 January 2017, as Kilmarnock lost 1–0 against Hamilton Academical in the Scottish Cup.

Colchester United (loan) 
On 31 January 2019, Roberts joined League Two side Colchester United on loan for the rest of the season. He made his club debut as a substitute in Colchester's 4–0 win at Northampton Town on 2 February. He returned to Newcastle on 13 March 2019.

Notts County 
On 20 January 2020, Roberts joined the National League side Notts County. He signed until the 2020-2021 season.

On 13 November 2020 he signed an extension until 2022-23.

Aberdeen
He signed for Aberdeen in July 2022.

References

External links
 
 
 Newcastle United profile 

1997 births
Living people
Association football wingers
English footballers
England semi-pro international footballers 
Newcastle United F.C. players
Gateshead F.C. players
Kilmarnock F.C. players
Colchester United F.C. players
National League (English football) players
Footballers from Newcastle upon Tyne
Blyth Spartans A.F.C. players
Notts County F.C. players
Aberdeen F.C. players
Scottish Professional Football League players